Verbal dictation describes a theory about how the Holy Spirit was involved with the people who first physically inscribed the Bible. According to this theory, the human role was a purely mechanical one: their individuality was by-passed whilst they wrote, and neither did their cultural background have any influence on what they wrote, because these writers were under the control of God. This may have been the original understanding of inspiration for the people of the Bible.

According to James Barr this theory of inspiration was popular among Protestant theologians during the sixteenth and seventeenth centuries.  According to Frederic Farrar, Martin Luther did not understand inspiration to mean that scripture was dictated in a purely mechanical manner.  Instead, Luther "held that they were not dictated by the Holy Spirit, but that His illumination produced in the minds of their writers the knowledge of salvation, so that divine truth had been expressed in human form, and the knowledge of God had become a personal possession of man. The actual writing was a human not a supernatural act."  Farrar says that John Calvin also rejected the verbal dictation theory.  Today, according to T.D. Lea and H.P. Griffen, "[n]o respected Evangelicals maintain that God dictated the words of Scripture."

See also
 Biblical inspiration

References

Further reading

Christian theology of the Bible